Aculco is a station along Line 8 of the metro of Mexico City. It is located under the bridge where the Trabajadoras Sociales (Eje 6 Sur) passes over the Eje 3 Ote in the Colonia Pueblo Aculco neighborhood of the Iztapalapa borough of Mexico City. The station's logo is a water wave in a canal. In Nahuatl it means "where the water twists". The name is also the name of the Aculco municipipality in the State of Mexico.

History
The station was opened on 20 July 1994.

Metro service at the station was interrupted on 16 December 2006 after an accident in which a passenger fell onto the tracks. On 24 July 2007 a boy was born to a passenger at the station. On 26 September 2010 a Line 8 train operator was arrested and fired for drunk driving after an incident in which he opened the doors on the opposite side of the train from the Aculco station platform.

From 23 April to 18 June 2020, the station was temporarily closed due to the COVID-19 pandemic in Mexico.

Ridership

References 

Aculco
Railway stations opened in 1994
1994 establishments in Mexico
Mexico City Metro stations in Iztapalapa